Liuzao (Shanghainese: loh4tsau3) is a town of Pudong New Area, Shanghai, located about  west of Shanghai Pudong International Airport and more than  southeast of Lujiazui. , it has 2 residential communities (居委会) and 10 villages under its administration.

See also 
 List of township-level divisions of Shanghai

References 

Towns in Shanghai
Pudong